Otto Adam Bluege (July 20, 1909 – June 28, 1977) was an American professional baseball player. Nicknamed "Squeaky", he was a shortstop over parts of two seasons (–) with the Cincinnati Reds. The native and lifelong resident of Chicago, Illinois, was the younger brother of Ossie Bluege, who had a lengthy career as a third baseman, coach, manager and front-office executive with the Washington Senators/Minnesota Twins.

Otto Bluege threw and batted right-handed, and was listed as standing  and weighing . His professional playing career lasted for 13 seasons (1928–1938; 1940–1941).

In 109 games played in the majors, he compiled a .213 batting average in 291 at-bats, with 18 runs batted in. His 62 big-league hits included six doubles and two triples.

After retiring from the field, he scouted for the Senators and Twins. Otto Bluege died in Chicago at the age of 67.

External links

1909 births
1977 deaths
Baseball players from Chicago
Birmingham Barons players
Bowling Green Barons players
Cincinnati Reds players
Columbus Red Birds players
Dubuque Dubs players
Dubuque Tigers players
Green Bay Bluejays players
Indianapolis Indians players
Jersey City Giants players
Major League Baseball shortstops
Milwaukee Brewers (minor league) players
Minnesota Twins scouts
Peoria Tractors players
St. Paul Saints (AA) players
Washington Senators (1901–60) scouts